HMS Artemis (P449) was an  of the Royal Navy, built by Scotts Shipbuilding & Engineering Co. of Greenock and launched 28 August 1946. The submarine sank while refueling in 1971, was raised and sold for breaking up in 1972.

Design
Like all Amphion-class submarines, Artemis had a displacement of  when at the surface and  while submerged. The submarine was powered by two Admiralty ML eight-cylinder diesel engines generating  each. It also contained four electric motors, each producing , that drove two shafts.

Artemis was fitted with ten 21 inch (533 mm) torpedo tubes, one QF 4 inch naval gun Mk XXIII, one Oerlikon 20 mm cannon, and a .303 British Vickers machine gun. Its torpedo tubes were fitted to the bow and stern, and it could carry twenty torpedoes. Its complement was sixty-one crew members.

Service history
In September 1952 Artemis deployed to Canada a second time for anti-submarine training with the Royal Canadian Navy. Artemis replaced the damaged , which had developed issues while training with vessels of the Royal Canadian Navy off Bermuda. In 1953 she took part in the Fleet Review to celebrate the Coronation of Queen Elizabeth II.

The sub dipped by the stern (she was being prepared for fuelling using the aft externals) which filled and the sub sank. All aboard escaped, with decisive action by four crew members resulting in bravery awards. She was raised on 6 July and decommissioned, sold to be broken up for scrap on 12 December 1971.

References

Publications

External links
 Boat veterans homepage
 Pictures of HMS Artemis at MaritimeQuest

 

Amphion-class submarines
Cold War submarines of the United Kingdom
Ships built by Scotts Shipbuilding and Engineering Company
1946 ships
Maritime incidents in 1968
Maritime incidents in 1971